The name five-lined skink can refer to different species of skinks:

 Plestiodon fasciatus, the five-lined skink or eastern red-headed skink of North America
 Trachylepis quinquetaeniata, the five-lined mabuya of Africa

Animal common name disambiguation pages